The 1979–80 Ohio Bobcats men's basketball team represented Ohio University as a member of the Mid-American Conference in the college basketball season of 1979–80. The team was coached by Dale Bandy in his sixth and final season at Ohio. They played their home games at Convocation Center. The Bobcats finished with a record of 8–18 and last (10th) in the MAC regular season with a conference record of 5–11.  The 18 losses were the most in program history at the time.

Schedule

|-
!colspan=9 style=| Regular Season

Source:

Statistics

Team Statistics
Final 1979–80 Statistics

Source

Player statistics

Source

References

Ohio Bobcats men's basketball seasons
Ohio
Ohio Bobcats men's basketball
Ohio Bobcats men's basketball